The Women's race H4 track cycling event at the 2012 Summer Paralympics took place on September 7 at Brands Hatch. six riders from five different nations competed. The race distance was 48 km.

Results

Source:

References

Women's road race H4
2012 in women's road cycling